Adam McArthur is an American actor and voice actor based in Los Angeles, California. His best-known role is voicing Marco Diaz in Star vs. the Forces of Evil, Prince Lee-Char in Star Wars: The Clone Wars, Ricky, and Patrick in Shadows House, Yuri in Sakugan, Chifuyu Matsuno in Tokyo Revengers, and Yuji Itadori in Jujutsu Kaisen. He also voices characters on other animation shows, and on-screen on some nationally aired commercials. In martial arts, he specializes in kung fu, has been a champion at some tournaments, and has been the featured subject of several documentaries that have aired on PBS.

Biography
McArthur grew up in Pinole, California in the San Francisco Bay Area He graduated from Pepperdine University in 2005 with a degree in Acting and Television Production, and has worked with improv groups in the Los Angeles area. As a martial artist, he specializes in Wushu kung fu, and other forms such as judo. He started when he was 11. In 2003, he was an All Around Grand Champion in the Adult Male Traditional category at the UC Berkeley Chinese Martial Arts Tournament. In 2006, he was selected for the documentary Kung Fu: Journey to the East where he and fellow martial arts practitioner Kristi Jordan visited China to learn from martial arts experts and perform at a stage presentation at the Shaolin Temple. The show was broadcast on PBS. He would return in 2014 for another PBS-broadcast documentary called Shaolin Kung Fu Monks where he follows the group as they go on a worldwide tour with stops in Moscow, New York City, and Los Angeles.

McArthur's first major role in animation voice-over was in Star vs. the Forces of Evil, which premiered as one of the top animated shows on the Disney XD channel, and which was ordered for a second season ahead of its regular broadcast of the first season. He voices Marco Diaz, a teenage boy whose family hosts the title character as an exchange student, and who becomes her partner in their adventures. Daron Nefcy said he brings something special to the character, making Marco charming as well as smart and aware of the world around him. He voiced in the series Star Wars: The Clone Wars as Mon Cala Prince Lee-Char for a story arc in season 4. In an interview with TheForce.net, McArthur said he used his regular voice for his character.

McArthur was involved in theater throughout high school and college, and has worked at ComedySportz in Los Angeles as part of their improv team. In 2015, he starred in an Audi commercial called "The Scripted Life" which aired during the 2015 Emmy Awards and was also nominated for several awards among film festivals and advertising critics. In 2022, McArthur was nominated for Best VA Performance (EN) at the Crunchyroll Anime Awards for his performance as Yuji Itadori in Jujutsu Kaisen.

Filmography

Live-action
 Motocross Kids – Male reporter
 Jack & Bobby – The Track Guy (Ep. 9: "Chess Lessons")
 Kung Fu: Journey to the East (2006) – Himself – Documentary, featured subject
 El Dorado – Jack Thompson
 Scooby-Doo! Spooky Camp Stories – Counselor Cooper
 Shaolin Kung Fu Monks (2014) – Himself – Documentary, featured subject
 "The Scripted Life" (2015) – Carl – Audi television commercial 

 Krampus (2015)

Animation
 Phantom Investigators – Max (Ep. 11: "Ghosts on Film")
 The LeBrons – Erik
 Star Wars: The Clone Wars – Mon Cala Prince Lee-Char (Eps.: "Prisoners" and "Water War"/"Gungan Attack")
 The Adventures of Puss in Boots – Chad (Ep. 3: "Brothers")
 Star vs. the Forces of Evil (–2019) – Marco Diaz
 Ollie and Scoops – Rudy
 Too Loud – Hilarious Larry
 Big City Greens – Ashton
 S.A.L.E.M. – Oliver

Anime
 Jujutsu Kaisen (Crunchyroll dub) – Yuji Itadori
 Shadows House (FUNimation dub) – Ricky/Patrick
 My Hero Academia (FUNimation dub) – Koku Hanabata/Trumpet
 The Saint's Magic Power is Omnipotent (FUNimation dub) – Kyle Salutania
 Tokyo Revengers (Crunchyroll dub) – Chifuyu Matsuno
 Sakugan (Crunchyroll dub) – Yuri
 Sing a Bit of Harmony (FUNimation dub) – Prince
 The Orbital Children (Netflix dub) – Taiyo Tsukuba
 Fruits Basket: Prelude (Crunchyroll dub) - Teacher
 Goodbye, Don Glees! (GKIDS dub) - Rōma Kamogawa
 Bungo Stray Dogs (Crunchyroll dub) - Saigiku Jouno

Video games
 Final Fantasy Type-0 HD – Joker
 Far Cry 5
 Ghostwire: Tokyo  – Man A, Boy B
 Shadow of the Tomb Raider

References

External links
 
 
 

Living people
American male film actors
American male television actors
American male video game actors
American male voice actors
American male web series actors
American wushu practitioners
Male actors from Los Angeles
Pepperdine University alumni
Place of birth missing (living people)
21st-century American male actors
Year of birth missing (living people)